Ani Grigoryan (born on June 15, 1984), better known by her stage name Ani Lupe (Անի Լուպե), is an Armenian actress. She is known for her role as Ruzan Azizyan on The Azizyans.

Life 
Grigoryan was born in Yerevan on June 15, 1984. She finished her school in 2001 and in the same year she began studying at the Yerevan State Institute of Theatre and Cinematography. During her studying, she also worked at Yerevan State Institute of Musical Chamber Theater as an actress. In 2009, she began her working at Yerevan State Institute of Chamber Theater. She has played in many presentations, such as Kabare, Neron and Shat Love Story.

Filmography

Awards and nominations

References

1984 births
Living people
Actresses from Yerevan
Armenian film actresses
21st-century Armenian actresses
Armenian stage actresses